Princess Kay of the Milky Way is the title awarded to the winner of the statewide Minnesota Dairy Princess Program, an annual competition organized by the Midwest Dairy Association. During her one-year term, the Princess Kay of the Milky Way serves as official good-will ambassador for the Minnesota dairy industry. The Princess is crowned every year at the Minnesota State Fair, and receives a scholarship. The crowning of Princess Kay annually garners statewide as well as national media coverage.

The competition was the idea of Lew Conlon, who managed the Minnesota Dairy Industry Committee. The name "Princess Kay of the Milky Way" was selected from over 10,000 entries in a 1954 contest to name the Minnesota dairy princess.

Princess Program

Individual counties in Minnesota may select Dairy Princesses who meet the eligibility requirements listed below.  These Princesses may then advance to the Princess Kay of the Milky Way finalists competition held each spring. Of the nearly 100 princesses in the competition, 10 finalists are selected, and are then required to take on public relations roles at the Minnesota State Fair. The new Princess Kay is selected just before the State Fair, and the coronation takes place the night before the State Fair opens. The crowned Princess Kay then makes numerous media and public appearances during the Fair's 12 days and throughout the coming year on behalf of Minnesota dairy farmers.

Contestants must be U.S. citizens, and their parents, guardians, or siblings must be actively involved in the production of dairy products. They must also have completed a high school education, be under the age of 24, and be unmarried with no children. Candidates are judged on "communication skills, personality, general knowledge of the dairy industry and its products, and their commitment to dairy promotion."

Butter sculptures
Since 1965, sculptures of the winning Princess Kay and other finalists have been carved, one per day, at the Minnesota State Fair. Recent butter sculptures have been carved out of a 90-pound block of Grade A butter, in a walk-in, glass-walled refrigerator. The butter is manufactured by Associated Milk Producers in New Ulm, Minnesota. The butter carving booth is one of the most popular exhibits at the Fair. The carving of the butter sculpture takes 6–8 hours per finalist. For nearly 40 years, Linda Christensen has sculpted the Princesses' butter sculptures. Princesses take their butter sculpture home with them at the end of the Fair.

Previous Princesses
Below is a list of previous Princesses.

Notes

References
Meet the Past Princess Kays, archived September 29, 2007.
Princess Kay of the Milky Way - Midwest Dairy Association
Minnesota State Fair Journal; A Dairy Queen, Oops, Princess, in All Her Buttery Glory, a 2005 New York Times article on Linda Christensen and the butter carvings.
Midwest Dairy Association

History of Minnesota
Minnesota culture
1954 establishments in Minnesota
Minnesota State Fair
Competitions in the United States
Women's events